St. Bonaventure Indian School is a Catholic K-8 school in Thoreau, New Mexico. It is under the Roman Catholic Diocese of Gallup, and from 1986 to 2001 had high school classes.

It is also known as Kateri Tekakwitha Academy, or Blessed Kateri Tekakwitha Academy.

History
Douglas McNeill, a member of the Catholic clergy active in the area in the 1970s, saw an image of a child in poverty in the region and felt inspiration to establish a school. 

St. Bonaventure School started as a preschool in 1980. McNeill received assistance from the Gallup Head Start organization, which arranged school meals. An elementary and high school were added, with the former receiving accreditation in 1985 and the latter added in 1986, with accreditation for that coming the following year. From 1986 to 1989 enrollment increased by almost 200%. A new building was dedicated in 1999.

The high school program ended in 2001, with the board of directors funding scholarships for students to attend high school classes at Gallup Catholic School. The current preschool facility opened in 2002, and the current grade 2-4 buildings, each with one classroom, opened in 2003.

In 2015 the diocese, facing bankruptcy proceedings, stated the school was for sale, but the school stated it was privately owned and therefore not for sale. In 2016 a proposed settlement was established which would mean the mission leadership would pay the diocese $550,000 and receive the title to the property.

Academics
The high school division had the standard classes as well as art, drama, and music.

Operations
The school provides free meals and is free of charge.

 the main source of funds are donations.

In 1989 the school was to have athletics, but in 1994 the school did not offer athletic programs.

Academic performance
In 1994, when it had high school, almost all students attended tertiary education after graduation, and no student left the education system before they graduated from a secondary institution.

Demographics
In 2015 it had 215 students, 55 Navajo employees, and 10 non-Navajo employees. 90% of the about students were classified as low income.

In 1994 it had 300 students. At the time, 90% of them were from the Navajo tribe. At the time the school employed seven missionaries as teachers; they were not priests.

Transportation
In 1989 the school had buses to Bluewater, Crownpoint, Gallup, and Grants. Areas on the way to the school were also serviced.

References

External links
 St. Bonaventure Indian Mission & School

Defunct Catholic secondary schools in the United States
Private high schools in New Mexico
Private elementary schools in New Mexico
Private middle schools in New Mexico
Schools in McKinley County, New Mexico
1980 establishments in New Mexico
Educational institutions established in 1980
Private K–8 schools in the United States
Private K-12 schools in the United States